Matúš Štefančík (born 13 December 1995) is a Slovak footballer who plays for MFK Vranov nad Topľou as a defender.

Career

1. FC Tatran Prešov
Štefančík made his professional debut for 1. FC Tatran Prešov against MFK Zemplín Michalovce on 18 March 2017.

References

External links
 
 Ligy.sk profile 
 Futbalnet Profile 

1995 births
Living people
Slovak footballers
Association football defenders
Slovak Super Liga players
1. FC Tatran Prešov players
MFK Vranov nad Topľou players